Vladimir Sergeyevich Yumin (18 December 1951 – 4 March 2016) was a Russian freestyle wrestler. He won an Olympic gold medal in 1976 and world titles in 1974, 1977, 1978 and 1979, placing second in 1975 and third in 1973. He was also European champion in 1975–77. Domestically, Yumin won Soviet titles in 1973–75 and 1978. He placed third at the 1980 Soviet Championships and did not qualify for the Olympics. After that he retired and worked as a wrestling coach with the Turkish national team. In 2009 he was inducted into the International Wrestling Hall of Fame.

Yumin was born in Omsk in Siberia, but soon moved to the south to Kaspiysk, Dagestan. He spent most of his life there, and died of a heart attack aged 64.

References

External links

1951 births
2016 deaths
Soviet male sport wrestlers
Olympic wrestlers of the Soviet Union
Wrestlers at the 1976 Summer Olympics
Russian male sport wrestlers
Olympic gold medalists for the Soviet Union
Olympic medalists in wrestling
Honoured Masters of Sport of the USSR
World Wrestling Championships medalists
Medalists at the 1976 Summer Olympics
World Wrestling Champions